KRR1 small subunit processome component homolog is a protein that in humans is encoded by the KRR1 gene.

References

Further reading